Drepanogynis bifasciata is a species of moth of the family Geometridae first described by Hermann Dewitz in 1881. It is found in South Africa, Lesotho, and Zimbabwe.

References
Dewitz, 1881. Afrikanische Nachtschmetterlinge. Nova acta Leopoldina Bd. 42, no. 2

Ennominae
Fauna of Lesotho
Moths of Africa
Lepidoptera of South Africa
Moths described in 1881